Carl Craig is an English football manager. He is currently the manager of Minneapolis City in USL League Two. He was formerly the head coach of NASL club Minnesota United.

Early life
Craig spent some time on the books of Newcastle United as a young footballer but fell away from the game in his mid-teens. During the 1980s he was a member of punk bands called Reality Control and The Abductor, and toured with Chumbawamba. Craig then ran a whole foods co-operative with bandmates out of a flat in Newcastle. Craig was also a vegan in this period and his first experience of football coaching was for the team of a workers co-op music club.

Coaching career
Prior to moving to the United States, Craig had acquired his full English FA badge and spent some time working for the FA in the English north-east, as well as for the Newcastle United academy system along with Sheffield Wednesday. After moving to the United States in 1994, Craig progressed through the managerial ranks in the Minnesota area working in youth leagues then the Premier Development League and National Premier Soccer League before becoming assistant manager of Minnesota United in 2010.

Craig was promoted to head coach of Minnesota United in December 2015. Under Craig's guidance in the 2016 season, Minnesota finished 5th in NASL missing out on the playoffs.

On 1 December 2020, Craig was announced as the head coach and technical director of USL League One club Forward Madison FC.

Craig was appointed manager of USL League Two club Minneapolis City of 24 January 2023.

Managerial record

References

External links
 Club profile

Living people
English footballers
English expatriate footballers
English expatriate sportspeople in the United States
English football managers
English expatriate football managers
Sportspeople from Newcastle upon Tyne
1965 births
Association footballers not categorized by position
USL League One coaches
Forward Madison FC coaches
Minnesota United FC coaches
North American Soccer League coaches